WRAQ-LP (92.7 FM) is a radio station licensed to serve the community of Angelica, New York. The station is owned by Angelica Community Radio Inc. It airs a community radio format. The station is an affiliate of the syndicated Pink Floyd program "Floydian Slip."

The station was assigned the WRAQ-LP call letters by the Federal Communications Commission on February 26, 2014.

References

External links
 Official Website
 

RAQ-LP
RAQ-LP
Radio stations established in 2016
2016 establishments in New York (state)
Variety radio stations in the United States
Allegany County, New York